Buzfuz Rock is a rock  west of Snubbin Island in the Pitt Islands, northern Biscoe Islands. It was named by the UK Antarctic Place-Names Committee in 1971 after Sergeant Buzfuz, a character in Charles Dickens' The Pickwick Papers.

References 

Rock formations of the Biscoe Islands